Stephen L. Russell is an American actor, playwright, and theater director. He is best known for his video game voice roles as Garrett in the Thief series, Corvo Attano in Dishonored 2, and various characters in Skyrim and the Fallout series.

Career
Russell appeared onstage in Huntington's The Last Hurrah. Other stage credits include The Life of Galileo (Underground Railway Theater), The Bottom of the Lake (Tir Na Theatre), Daughter of Venus (Boston Playwrights' Theatre), A Pinter Duet, A House With No Walls, White People (New Repertory Theatre), And Then There Were None, A Prayer for Owen Meany (Stoneham Theatre), Talley's Folly (The Lyric Stage Company of Boston), and more than two dozen productions with the Wellfleet Harbor Actors' Theatre (WHAT), including The Beauty Queen of Leenane and the Eliott Norton Award-winning production of A New War. He is the author of 13 plays for young audiences and won the 2009 WHAT Award for Sustained Artistic Excellence.

Russell made his debut film appearances as Bob in the 2007 film Noëlle and in 2008 appeared as Luther Norris in the film Chatham. In 2009, he played a minor role in the film The Ghosts of Girlfriends Past. In addition to voicing Garrett in the Thief video game series, he voiced Garrett's chief antagonist Karras in Thief II: The Metal Age, as well as many of the supporting characters in the series. He contributed the voice of the starship Von Brauns central computer XERXES and William Bedford Diego in System Shock 2. He also provided the voices of Andy, Mr. Buckingham, The Great One, Wadsworth, Sergeant RL-3, Cerberus, Enclave Scientists, an Enclave Soldier, and every Mr. Handy in Fallout 3, Fallout 4, and Fallout 76. The 2011 game Skyrim features Russell voicing a range of characters, including Barbas the talking dog, Daedric Prince Clavicus Vile, Belethor, and Thieves Guild leader Mercer Frey. In the 2015 game Fallout 4, he voices Codsworth and the android detective Nick Valentine. He provided the voice for Lord Protector Corvo Attano in the 2016 video game Dishonored 2.

Russell did not return to the Thief franchise for the 2014 reboot because it utilized motion-capture acting, which required the voice actors to physically portray the characters and perform their own stunts. Eidos-Montréal announced that Russell had been replaced by Romano Orzari for the role of Garrett in the series, and explained their decision: "The actor playing Garrett needed to be able to perform his own stunts. Garrett's a really athletic guy. We could have pasted Stephen's voice on top of the actions and stunts of someone else, but this wouldn't appear natural." The decision upset some fans of the series, who initiated an online petition requesting Eidos-Montréal to bring back Russell as lead voice actor.

Personal life
He is a vegetarian. He has a son named Peter, who is an actor and musician, and a daughter named Robin, who is a voice actress.

Selected voice credits

References

External links

IGDB.com

Place of birth missing (living people)
Date of birth missing (living people)
Living people
American male film actors
American theatre directors
American male voice actors
American male video game actors
Year of birth missing (living people)
American male writers